Rutland is an unincorporated locality in Senlac Rural Municipality No. 411, Saskatchewan, Canada.

See also

 List of communities in Saskatchewan
 List of ghost towns in Saskatchewan

Senlac No. 411, Saskatchewan
Ghost towns in Saskatchewan
Unincorporated communities in Saskatchewan
Division No. 13, Saskatchewan